Han Gang may refer to:

Han Gang (athlete) (born 1978), Chinese marathon runner
Han Kang (born 1970), Korea writer

See also

Han River (Korea), a major river in South Korea known as the Hangang